Chicoreus aculeatus, common name the pendant murex, is a species of predatory sea snail, a marine gastropod mollusk in the family Muricidae, the murex snails or rock snails.

Description
The size of an adult shell varies between 38 mm and 65 mm.

Distribution
This species occurs along the coast of South Africa and in the Pacific Ocean along the coasts of Japan, the Philippines and the Moluccas.

References

 Lamarck, J. B. P. A., 1822 Histoire naturelle des animaux sans vertèbres, vol. 7, p. 711 pp
 Houart, R., 1992. The genus Chicoreus and related genera (Gastropoda: Muricidae) in the Indo-West Pacific. Mémoires du Muséum national d'Histoire naturelle 154(A): 1–188
 Merle D., Garrigues B. & Pointier J.-P. (2011) Fossil and Recent Muricidae of the world. Part Muricinae. Hackenheim: Conchbooks. 648 pp. page(s): 103
 Liu, J.Y. [Ruiyu] (ed.). (2008). Checklist of marine biota of China seas. China Science Press. 1267 pp

External links
 
 MNHN. Paris: neotype

Chicoreus
Gastropods described in 1822